Juan Pablo Buch Pabón (born 21 November 1986) is a Colombian football manager, currently in charge of Ecuadorian club Técnico Universitario.

Career
Buch worked as a fitness coach for Universitario Popayán, Deportes Quindío and Alianza Petrolera back in his home country, before joining Cheche Hernández's staff at Ecuadorian side Técnico Universitario in 2019.

In August 2022, after manager Iván Vázquez was sacked, Buch was named interim manager of the first team. After taking over the club in the last position, he led the side to an impressive run of six wins and two draws in ten matches, and managed to avoid relegation.

On 25 October 2022, Buch was confirmed as manager of Técnico for the 2023 season, after renewing his contract.

References

External links

1986 births
Living people
Colombian football managers
C.D. Técnico Universitario managers
Colombian expatriate football managers
Colombian expatriate sportspeople in Ecuador
Expatriate football managers in Ecuador